S. canina may refer to:
 Scrophularia canina, a plant species in the genus Scrophularia
 Snyderidia canina, a fish species in the genus Snyderidia

See also
 Canina (disambiguation)